The close front rounded vowel, or high front rounded vowel, is a type of vowel sound, used in some spoken languages. The symbol in the International Phonetic Alphabet that represents this sound is /y/, and the equivalent X-SAMPA symbol is y.

Short  and long  occurred in pre-Modern Greek. In the Attic and Ionic dialects of Ancient Greek, front  developed by fronting from back  around the 6th to 7th century BC. A little later, the diphthong  when not before another vowel monophthongized and merged with long . Through vowel shortening in Koine Greek, long  merged with short . For more information, see the articles on Ancient Greek and Koine Greek phonology.

In most languages, this rounded vowel is pronounced with compressed lips ('exolabial'). However, in a few cases the lips are protruded ('endolabial').

Close front compressed vowel
There is no dedicated diacritic for compression in the IPA. The spread-lip diacritic  may also be used with a rounded vowel letter  as an ad hoc symbol, though technically 'spread' means unrounded.

Features

Occurrence
Because front rounded vowels are assumed to have compression, and few descriptions cover the distinction, some of the following may actually have protrusion.

Close front protruded vowel

Catford notes that most languages with rounded front and back vowels use distinct types of labialization, protruded back vowels and compressed front vowels. However, a few languages, such as Scandinavian ones, have protruded front vowels. One of these, Swedish, even contrasts the two types of rounding in front vowels (see near-close near-front rounded vowel, with Swedish examples of both types of rounding).

As there are no diacritics in the IPA to distinguish protruded and compressed rounding, an old diacritic for labialization, will be used here as an ad hoc symbol for protruded front vowels.

Acoustically, this sound is "between" the more typical compressed close front vowel  and the unrounded close front vowel .

Features

Occurrence

See also
 Near-close near-front protruded vowel
 Close central protruded vowel
 Index of phonetics articles

Notes

References

External links
  (note that some languages might actually have semivowel // instead of this vowel)

Close vowels
Front vowels
Rounded vowels